"Tower of Babylon" is a science fantasy novelette by American writer Ted Chiang, published in 1990. The story revisits the tower of Babel myth as a construction megaproject, in a setting where the principles of pre-scientific  cosmology (the geocentric model, celestial spheres, etc.) are literally true. It is Chiang's first published work.

The story won the 1991 Nebula Award for Best Novelette, and was reprinted in Chiang's 2002 anthology, Stories of Your Life and Others.

Synopsis
Hillalum is a miner from Elam who has been summoned to the Tower of Babylon, an enormous brick tower that has been in continuous construction for centuries. He and his colleagues have been hired to dig through the Vault of Heaven to discover Yahweh's creation. Hillalum alone passes safely through the Vault. After a perilous journey ever-upwards, he finds that he has reemerged back at the surface, some distance from the Tower, rather than in Heaven as expected.

Reception
"Tower" won the 1991 Nebula Award for Best Novelette, and was nominated for the 1991 Hugo Award for Best Novelette.

References

External links 

 

Science fiction short stories
1990 short stories
Works originally published in Omni (magazine)
Nebula Award for Best Novelette-winning works
Short stories by Ted Chiang
Tower of Babel in art